Allodape is a genus of bees belonging to the family Apidae.

The species of this genus are found in Africa.

Species

Species:

Allodape armatipes 
Allodape australissima 
Allodape brachycephala

References

Apidae